Clayhall is a district of Ilford in the London Borough of Redbridge in east London, England. It is a suburban development. The name is derived from an old manor house that stood within the current area. It is first mentioned in a document of 1203 as being an area of land granted to Adam and Matilda de la Claie by Richard de la Claie. The estate probably remained in the hands of this family for about one hundred years, after which it passed through several hands, without ever being positively identified by name, until in a conveyance of 1410 it is described as the manor of Clayhall.

In the middle of the 17th century, Sir Christopher Hatton, cousin of the Lord Chancellor Sir Christopher Hatton, lived at the Manor House, but by the middle of the next century the estate was let to tenant farmers. The last tenants of the property were William Ingram, until his death in 1853, and then William, James and Frank Lamb, respectively father, son and grandson. The manor house itself was demolished, probably during the ownership of Peter Eaton, in the middle of the 18th century, and replaced by a farm house. The estate was broken up for building sites in 1935.

Clayhall Park in Longwood Gardens is one of Ilford's largest open spaces and has a bowling green, two children's play areas and tennis courts.
Clayhall also has a small community library, operated by Vision RCL and a part of Redbridge Libraries.

Education

Ilford County High School, Barkingside Beal High School, Caterham High School, Gilbert Colvin Primary School, Glade Primary School, King Solomon High School, Clore Tikva primary school and Parkhill Junior School.

Transportation
Despite its large population and area size, Clayhall has no direct London Underground or other rail link. The closest tube stations are Gants Hill, Barkingside, Fairlop, Hainault, Chigwell, South Woodford and Redbridge, which are all served by the Central line in a circumferential proximity of the district.

The area does, however, have a few London Bus routes.

References
"Redbridge Prints, Scenes from the 18th and 19th Centuries with Historical Notes", London Borough of Redbridge Libraries Department, publication year unavailable.

Districts of the London Borough of Redbridge